Jamie Doyle (born 1 October 1961) is a Scottish former professional footballer, who played for Partick Thistle, Motherwell and Dumbarton in the Scottish Football League.

His younger brother Gerry was also a footballer who played for Partick Thistle in the same period, and was later a teammate at Dumbarton.

References

External links

1961 births
Living people
Scottish footballers
Partick Thistle F.C. players
Motherwell F.C. players
Dumbarton F.C. players
Glenafton Athletic F.C. players
Scottish Football League players
Association football midfielders
Scotland under-21 international footballers
Footballers from Glasgow
Scottish Football League representative players